Shreyansanath was the eleventh Jain Tirthankara of the present age (Avasarpini). According to Jain beliefs, he became a Siddha – a liberated soul which has destroyed all of its karma. Shreyansanatha was born to King Vishnu and Queen Vishna at Simhapuri, near Sarnath in the Ikshvaku dynasty. His birth date was the twelfth day of the Falgun Krishna month of the Indian calendar.

Main Temple
The Sarnath Jain Tirth temple located at Sarnath, Varanasi is one of the main shrines of Shreyansanatha.

Gallery

See also

God in Jainism
Arihant (Jainism)
Jainism and non-creationism

Notes

References
 

Tirthankaras
Solar dynasty